WMUB-LD, virtual channel 38 (UHF digital channel 31), is a low-powered France 24-affiliated television station serving Macon, Georgia, United States that is licensed to Warner Robins. The station is owned by Mercer University. WMUB-LD's transmitter is located along GA 87/US 23/US 129 ALT (Golden Isles Highway), along the Bibb–Twiggs county line. The station is available on all major cable providers in Central Georgia.

History
The station first signed on the air on September 17, 2010 as an affiliate of America One as WRWR-LD, and formerly operated from studios located on Radio Loop in Warner Robins. In late December 2011, WRWR-LD changed its affiliation to My Family TV. On November 1, 2013, the station changed its affiliation to Cozi TV.

On March 31, 2014, Georgia Eagle Media donated WRWR-LD to Mercer University. As part of the transaction, Mercer took over the station's operations under a temporary local marketing agreement until the university received approval from the Federal Communications Commission (FCC) to acquire the station. Mercer planned to move WRWR's master control facilities and operations from its existing Warner Robins studio to a facility located on the Mercer University campus that currently houses the College Hill Alliance and Georgia Public Broadcasting television station WMUM-TV (channel 29). At midnight that day, WRWR-LD became an affiliate of MHz WorldView.

In mid-July 2014, WRWR-LD changed its callsign to WMUB-LD.

On January 1, 2016, WMUB-LD changed affiliation to France 24.

Digital television

Digital channels
The station's digital channel is multiplexed:

The station carried Universal Sports on its second digital subchannel until January 1, 2012, when the network converted into a cable- and satellite-only network. On January 2, 2012, the station began carrying Tuff TV on its second digital subchannel (the network was dropped on March 31, 2014).

On February 2, 2021, WMUB-LD transitioned from RF channel 38 to RF channel 31.

Programming

Local programming
As WRWR-LD, the station produced several locally-produced programs, including Inside Georgia Politics (hosted by then-State Senator Cecil Staton), Todd Wilson's Georgia Journal, Under the Hood with Chris Ford, and Observations (hosted by local neurosurgeon Dr. Joe Sam Robinson, focusing on topics and people related to local healthcare issues). During high school football season, the station broadcasts a "Game of the Week" each Friday evening, featuring notable games from Houston County's five area high schools as well as occasional games from the Westfield School and Stratford Academy.

On November 12, 2010, WRWR-LD began airing Mercer Bears basketball games, with Todd Wilson and Drew Bollea providing play-by-play. In January 2012, the station began airing Southeastern Conference college basketball telecasts from ESPN Plus.

On August 12, 2014, WMUB announced it would replace the SEC TV games with the American Sports Network package.

Newscasts
On September 17, 2010, WRWR-LD debuted Newsnight on the Patriot, a two-hour nightly evening newscast aimed at the Warner Robins and Houston County area that aired weeknights from 6:00 to 8:00 and 10:00 to 11:30 p.m. (later 10:00 to 12:00 a.m.). The newscasts were broadcast in high definition from their debut; as such, WRWR-LD was the first television station in the Macon market to begin broadcasting its local newscasts in the format, and remained high-definition (HD) format until November 14, when WMAZ launched HD news for the first time with their 5:00 p.m. newscast. The program was cancelled on March 31, 2014, when WRWR-LD's license was donated by the station's owner Cecil Staton to Mercer University. With the donation, Mercer planned on producing a new student-produced newscast for the station beginning in the summer of 2014.

References

External links
 

Mercer University
2009 establishments in Georgia (U.S. state)
Low-power television stations in the United States
Television channels and stations established in 2009
MUB-LD